https://r.k.com

To Hell 'n' Back is a anthology album of Grong Grong, released on December 8, 2009, by Memorandum Recordings.

Reception

AllMusic awarded To Hell 'n' Back four out of five stars, saying "plenty of bands have made music like this that's full of arty calculation, but Grong Grong gave their noises a brutal, purposeful focus and feral passion that was both comic and just a bit scary." Spin and Trouser Press compared the band favorably to Scratch Acid, Killdozer and The Birthday Party and was especially complimentary towards Charles Tolnay's dissonant guitar technique.

Track listing

Personnel
Adapted from the To Hell 'n' Back liner notes.

Grong Grong
 Michael Farkas – lead vocals, saxophone, synthesizer, mixing
 George Klestines – drums, mixing
 Dave Taskas – bass guitar, mixing
 Charles Tolnay – guitar, mixing

Production and design
 Jello Biafra – liner notes
 Caroline Birkett – photography
 Eric Cecil – liner notes
 Andrew DeCaux – cover art, illustrations
 Bruce Griffiths – photography
 Regina Hayson – photography
 Russell Hopkinson – mastering
 Ian Underwood – illustrations, design

Release history

References

External links 
 Grong Grong at iTunes
 

2009 compilation albums
Grong Grong (band) albums